Leuris Pupo Requejo (born 9 April 1977) is a Cuban shooter who has represented his nation at four Summer Olympic Games.

Pupo's first Olympic appearance came at the 2000 Summer Olympics held in Sydney, Australia where he finished tied for ninth place in the men's 25 metre rapid fire pistol. He competed in the same event at the 2004 Summer Olympics in Athens, Greece, finishing tied for seventh place, and again at the 2008 Summer Olympics in Beijing, China where he again finished seventh.

At the 2012 Summer Olympics in London, United Kingdom, Pupo won the gold medal in the men's 25 metre rapid fire pistol.

He won the silver medal in the men's 25 metre rapid fire pistol event at the 2020 Summer Olympics.

References

1977 births
Olympic shooters of Cuba
Cuban male sport shooters
Shooters at the 2000 Summer Olympics
Shooters at the 2004 Summer Olympics
Shooters at the 2008 Summer Olympics
Shooters at the 2012 Summer Olympics
Shooters at the 2016 Summer Olympics
Living people
Olympic gold medalists for Cuba
Olympic medalists in shooting
Medalists at the 2012 Summer Olympics
Pan American Games medalists in shooting
Shooters at the 2015 Pan American Games
Pan American Games gold medalists for Cuba
Shooters at the 2019 Pan American Games
Medalists at the 2019 Pan American Games
Shooters at the 2020 Summer Olympics
Medalists at the 2020 Summer Olympics
Olympic silver medalists for Cuba

People from Holguín
21st-century Cuban people